James or Jim Poole may refer to:
James Poole (painter), (Birmingham 1804-Sheffield 1886), English painter
Jim Poole (first baseman) (James Ralph Poole, 1895–1975), American baseball player
Jim Poole (American football) (1915–1994), American football player
James Richard Poole (born 1932), American badminton player 
Jim Poole (pitcher) (James Richard Poole, born 1966), American baseball player
James Poole (footballer) (born 1990), English footballer